Frank Oliver (30 November 1882 – after 1912) was an English professional footballer who played as a inside left and centre forward in the Football League for Clapton Orient and Everton.

Career statistics

References

1882 births
English footballers
Footballers from Southampton
Brentford F.C. players
English Football League players
Association football inside forwards
Everton F.C. players
Southern Football League players
Date of death missing
Leyton Orient F.C. players
Southport F.C. players